Prinzessin Nofretete is a 1936 operetta in 2 acts by Nico Dostal to a libretto by Rudolf Köller and the composer. It was premiered at the Cologne Opera.

Recording
Milko Milev, Lilli Wünscher, Angela Mehling, Jeffery Krueger, Musikalische Komödie Leipzig, Stefan Klingele. Rondeau 2017

References

1936 operas
Operas
Operas by Nico Dostal
German-language operettas